The Exposition des primitifs flamands à Bruges (Exhibition of Flemish Primitives at Bruges) was an art exhibition of paintings by the so-called Flemish Primitives (nowadays usually called Early Netherlandish painters) held in the Provinciaal Hof in Bruges between 15 June and 5 October 1902.

It was the largest exhibition of c 15th c Flemish art to date, consisted of 413 official catalogue entries, and drew some 35,000 visitors. The exposition was highly influential, leading to at least five contemporary books as well as numerous scholarly articles, and initiated deeper study of the Flemish Primitives by a new generation of connoisseurs. It also inspired Johan Huizinga to research and write his The Autumn of the Middle Ages. The change in attribution of many important works (in table below) reflects progress in understanding the era by art historians since then, although it is an ongoing process.

Exposition
The 1902 exhibition was not the first to focus on the Flemish Primitives, although it was the first on this scale and to generate so much interest and scientific feedback. Among earlier exhibitions were the 1867 "Tableaux de l'ancienne école Néerlandaise" in Bruges, also directed by W. H. J. Weale; the 1892 "Exhibition of pictures by masters of the Netherlandish and allied schools of XV and early XVI centuries" at the Burlington Fine Arts Club, with 60 pictures; and the 1899 Netherlandish School exhibition at the New Gallery (London), with 165 works.

The 1902 exposition was originally intended for Brussels, but moved to Bruges after the city refused to lend the many works it held to the exhibition if it did not take place in Bruges. It was held in the Provincial Government Palace in Bruges from 15 June until 15 September 1902, but due to popular demand was extended until 5 October 1902.

The president of the exhibition was Baron Henri Kervyn de Lettenhove.

William Henry James Weale wrote the notes for the catalogue for the painting section. The often erroneous attributions were those of the owners, but the position of the paintings in the exhibition generally reflected the opinion of the organizers, including Weale and Georges Hulin de Loo (a professor at the University of Ghent), regarding their authorship. The illustrated catalogue of the section showing manuscripts, miniatures, archive texts, seals, mereaux, coins and medals was written by Baron Albert Van Zuylen Van Nyevelt. A third section, covering needlework, gobelins, and the like, was catalogued by Isabelle Errera.

The exhibition showed some 400 paintings attributed to the Flemish Primitives, many of which had never before been exhibited. The display of many works by major artists created the first strong opportunity to compare their styles side by side and revise earlier attributions, either from one painter to another or from "work by" to "copy of a work by".

The exhibition was opened by King Leopold II of Belgium, and visited by Crown Prince Albert and Crown Princess Elisabeth on 3 July 1902.

Legacy
The exhibition showed far more of the most important remaining examples of Early Netherlandish panel painting than earlier exhibitions and sparked a lively discussion about the attributions of the paintings, started by Hulin de Loo: dissatisfied with the official catalogue, he published his own critical catalogue.

The exhibition greatly improved the appreciation of Early Netherlandish art, which previously had been chiefly appreciated only by a few collectors and art historians,
 but also led to shifts in the status of the artists: Hans Memling, who had been considered to be the major artist of the period, was surpassed by the likes of Jan van Eyck and Rogier van der Weyden. This has been attributed to the abundance of works by Memling at the exhibition, which made critics notice the lack of invention and overly serialized production he often showed, compared to the other masters.

Because the organizers of the exhibition had a somewhat Belgian nationalistic view, art lovers in other countries sometimes reacted vehemently to the appropriation of "their" painters by the Flemish or Belgians. In France, there were calls for a similar exhibition of French Primitives, which was organised in 1904 and tried to reclaim artists, like van der Weyden and Robert Campin, who were from French-speaking parts of the Netherlands; it also tried to cast Early Netherlandish painting as a derivative of Early French painting.

The Bruges exhibition directly influenced some painters, who incorporated aspects of Flemish Primitive painting into their work. Flemish expressionist Gustave Van de Woestijne changed his approach to portraiture, focusing more on the psychological aspects, while his colleague Valerius de Saedeleer was influenced by the landscapes he saw at the exhibition.

In 2002, a new exhibition documenting the 1902 exhibition and its impact was held in Bruges: "Impact 1902 Revisited. Early Flemish and Ancient Art exhibition. Bruges 15th June - 15th September 1902, Brugge, 2002.", with a catalogue by Eva Tahon, Piet Boyens e.a.

Publications
Apart from the official catalogue, a number of books and major articles were written about the exhibition, including:
(Anonymous), The Exhibition of Flemish Art at Bruges, in Athenaeum 3907 and 3908, 1902 (probably by Roger Fry)
(Anonymous (L.M.)), L'exposition des primitifs flamands à Bruges, in La chronique des arts et de la curiosité 15, 1902
Giorgio Le Brun, L'esposizione dei primitivi fiamminghi, Rassegna d'Arte 2 (1902)
Pol de Mont, Een paar opmerkingen betr. de Tentoonstelling van oude Nederlandsche schilderijen te Brugge, in de Nederlandsche Spectator, 1902
Pol de Mont, L'Evolution de la peinture néerlandaise aux XIVe, XVe et XVIe siècles et l'exposition de Bruges. Book, Haarlem, 1903
Pol de Mont, De paneelschildering in de Nederlanden gedurende de XIVe, XVe en de eerste helft van de XVIe eeuw naar aanleiding van de in 1902 te Brugge gehouden tentoonstelling, gezeid "Van Vlaamse priemietieven", Haarlem 1903
Franz Dülberg, Die Ausstellung altniederländischer Malerei in Brügge., in Zeitschrift für bildende Kunst 14 (1903)
Émile Durand-Greville, Originaux et Copies à propos de l'exposition de Bruges, Bruges 1902
Hippolyte Fierens-Gevaert, L'exposition des Primitifs Flamands à Bruges, in Revue de l'art ancien et moderne XII, 1902
Henri Frantz, L'exposition des primitifs flamands à Bruges, in Les Arts 7, 1902
Max Jakob Friedländer, Die Brügger Leihausstellung von 1902, in Repertorium für Kunstwissenschaft 26 (1903)
Max Jakob Friedländer, Meisterwerke der niederländischen Malerei des XV. und XVI. Jahrhunderts auf der Ausstellung zu Brügge 1902. Book, Munich, 1903
Jules Guiffrey, L'exposition des Primitifs Flamands à Bruges, multiple articles in "L'Art" in 1902 and 1903
Georges Hulin de Loo, Exposition de tableaux flamands des XIVe, XVe et XVIe siècles: catalogue critique précédé d'une introduction sur l'identité de certains maîtres anonymes. Book, Ghent, 1902. 
Henri Hymans, L'Exposition des primitifs flamands à Bruges. Gazette des Beaux-Arts 28 (1902); then republished as a book, Paris, 1902 
Georges Lafenestre, Les Vieux Maîtres à Bruges, in Revue des Deux Mondes, 1902
Georges Lafenestre, Les primitifs à Bruges et à Paris, 1900, 1902, 1904: Vieux Maîtres de France et des Pays-Bas Book
Wilhelm Martin, De Vlaamsche primitieven op de tentoonstelling te Brugge, special issue of Elsevier's Magazine, 1903
Octave Maus, The Exhibition of Early Flemish Pictures at Bruges, in The Magazine of Art, 1903
Alphonse Naert, Tentoonstelling van oude Vlaamsche kunst, te Brugge, in Dietsche Warande en Belfort, 1902
Claude Phillips, Impressions of the Bruges Exhibition, in The Fortnightly Review, 1902
Eugène-Justin Soil de Moriamé, L'école de Tournai, in Annales de la Société Historique et Archéologique de Tournai, 1902
Hugo von Tschudi, Ausstellung Altniederländische Malerei in Brügge, Juni-Sept. 1902, in Repertorium für Kunstwissenschaft, 1902
Octave Uzanne, The Exhibition of Primitive Art at Bruges, in The Connoisseur, 1902
Karel van de Woestijne, De Vlaamsche Primitieven, hoe ze waren te Brugge, in Onze Kunst, 1902 
Medard Verkest, Tentoonstelling van Vlaamsche Primitieven en Oude Meesters te Brugge, Tongeren, 1902
William Henry James Weale, The Early Painters of the Netherlands as Illustrated by the Bruges Exhibition of 1902., in the first issue of The Burlington Magazine (1903)

Exhibited works
The works are listed according to their current attributions; where known, the attributions as given by the official catalogue and the critical catalogue by Hulin de Loo are given as well.

Notes

External links
 Exposition des primitifs flamands et d'art ancien : Bruges : 15 juin au 15 septembre, 1902 : première section, tableaux : catalogue', by Weale, W. H. James, Bruges, 1902, on archive.org

Art exhibitions in Belgium
Early Netherlandish painting
1902 in art
1902 in Belgium